Korea Taekwondo Association (한국 태권도 협회; 韓國 跆拳道 協會; KTA), originally the Korea Tang Soo Do Association (1961), is the first taekwondo organisation. It was founded in 1959, although official South Korean sources give 1961 as its year of establishment. In 1966, some members of the KTA, led by H. H. Choi, broke off from the KTA and formed the International Taekwon-Do Federation (ITF). The Kukkiwon and the then-World Taekwondo Federation (WTF, now known as World Taekwondo [WT]) were created by the KTA in the early 1970s. The KTA sits under the Korea Sports Council, is aligned with Kukkiwon, and is a Member National Association (MNA) of the WT. Its goal is to promote the martial art taekwondo as a national sport within South Korea.

History

The KTA's history has been marked by political difficulties. In 1959, Choi Hong-hi was the first President of the KTA and Byung Jik Ro (listed as "No" by Park, 1993) and Kae Byung Yun were the inaugural Vice-Presidents. When H. H. Choi was appointed as South Korea's ambassador to Malaysia in 1962, Myung Shin Choi became the second President of the KTA. In the early 1960s, the KTA was renamed as the Korea Taesoodo Association, and then to the current form in 1965.

During the 1960s, the KTA assembled the twelve original masters of taekwondo to promote taekwondo throughout the world. Choi headed a demonstration tour of 18 countries in 1965; this was one of many demonstration missions that eventually covered every continent. Choi again became President in 1965, but was forced to resign after a year, reportedly due to his unpopular authoritarian leadership style. He went on to establish the International Taekwon-Do Federation (ITF) the following year. B. J. Ro of the Song Moo Kwan, who had been one of the KTA's inaugural Vice-Presidents, became the fourth President.

In 1967, Yong Chae Kim of the Kang Duk Kwan became the fifth President of the KTA. That same year, the KTA created new black belt forms, including Koryo, Keumgang, Taebaek, Pyongwon, Shipjin, Jittae, Cheongkwon, Hansoo, and Ilyo. On 29 January 1971, Un Yong Kim became the sixth President of the KTA, and continued in the position in 1973. The KTA's leadership would remain stable for the next 20 years or so. In 1989, Chong Soo Hong from the Moo Duk Kwan was appointed Vice-President of the KTA.

The early 2000s were a time of trouble for the KTA leadership. One source states that Un Yong Kim resigned from the KTA presidency in 2001, while other sources state that in 1997, Pil Gon Rhee was already in place as President of the KTA. In any case, Kim presided over the organisation for around 20 years. In March 2002, Cheon Seo Koo was elected President of the KTA, and apparently held that position until at least 2004, though news sources have reported that he was arrested in late 2003.

In early 2008, Jung Gil Kim was President of the KTA. On 11 June 2008, Joon Pyo Hong was elected as the 24th President of the KTA, and he continued in the position in 2009.

Rank promotions
The first official KTA dan promotion test was held on 11 November 1962. The KTA continued awarding dan ranks for several years, but handed over direct dan promotion responsibilities to either the then-WTF in April 1976, according to a Black Belt magazine report, or to Kukkiwon on 5 February 1980, according to historians Won Sik Kang and Kyong Myong Lee. Since then, however, some dan ranks have apparently still been awarded under the authority of the KTA (e.g., S. S. Lee's 9th dan from the Jidokwan, KTA, in 1993).

See also
 Korean martial arts
 Kwans

Notes 

a.  S. H. Park (1993, p. 248) lists the KTA's founding committee in 1959: "As announced in Dong-A Newspaper; President, Gen. Choi Hong Hi, Vice President, Mr. No Byung Jik, Mr. Yun Kae Byung. Secretary General, Hwang Ki. Standing Directors; Mr. Hyun Jong Myung, Mr. Lee Nam Suk, Mr. Lee Jong Woo, Mr. Ko Jae Chun and Mr. Lee Young Suk. Directors; Mr. Um Un Kyu, Mr. Chong Chang Young, Mr. Bae Young Ki and Mr. Nam Tae Hi. Auditors, Mr. Kim Soon Bae and Mr. Cho Byoung Shi."

b.  The claim that the KTA was founded in 1961 might be an attempt to dissociate the organisation from H. H. Choi (its inaugural president) due to later political differences between Choi and the South Korean government.

c.  People claiming dan ranks from the KTA include: I. Ahmed, 1st dan (1969), 2nd dan (1970); J. R. Hilland (dan rank and year unspecified); K.-S. Hong, 5th dan (year unspecified); E. A. Humesky, 1st dan (1968), 2nd dan (1970), 3rd dan (1972); C. D. Jung, 7th dan (year unspecified); K. W. Kim, 9th dan (1971); S. Kim, 6th dan (1967), 7th dan (1973), 8th dan (1979); Y. B. Kong, 9th dan (2005); S. S. Lee, 9th dan Jidokwan (1993); Y. S. Lee (dan rank and year unspecified); W. C. Park, 4th dan (1963), 5th dan (1966); T. Walsh, 2nd dan (1971); and Y. K. Yoon, 6th dan (1999).

References

External links 
 Korea Taekwondo Association 
 Korea Taekwondo Association 
 Korea Taekwondo Association  (older version)
 Korea Taekwondo Association Code of Etiquette (1971)
 Korea Taekwondo Association logo

Korea, South
Organizations based in Seoul
Sports organizations established in 1959
Taekwondo organizations
National Taekwondo teams